Altair 4 may refer to:
 The fictional planet Altair IV, in the 1956 film Forbidden Planet
 The storage planet named after Forbidden Planet'''s Altair IV from the novel The Tommyknockers by Stephen King
 A potential future NASA lunar landing mission
 A song from the 1990 album Tales from the Twilight World'', by German power metal band Blind Guardian